The Evening Standard Theatre Award for Best Actor is an annual award presented since 1955 by the Evening Standard in recognition of achievement in British theatre.

Winners and nominees

1950s

1960s

1970s

1980s

1990s

2000s

2010s

Multiple awards and nominations

Awards 
4 wins

 Simon Russell Beale

3 wins

 Albert Finney
 Ian Holm
 Alec McCowen
 Laurence Olivier
 Paul Scofield

2 wins

 Tom Courtenay
 Ralph Fiennes
 Michael Gambon
 John Gielgud
 Alan Howard
 Rory Kinnear
 Ian McKellen
 Eric Porter
 Michael Redgrave
 Nicol Williamson
 John Wood

Nominations 
3 nominations

 Kenneth Branagh

2 nominations

 Bertie Carvel
 Charles Edwards
 Ian McKellen
 Simon Russell Beale

See also 

 Laurence Olivier Award for Best Actor
 Critics' Circle Theatre Award for Best Actor
 Tony Award for Best Actor in a Play

References

External links 

 Evening Standard Theatre Award Winners 1980-2003
 Evening Standard Theatre Awards 1955-2000

Theatre acting awards
Award ceremonies
Evening Standard Awards